Momma Named Me Sheriff is an American adult animated sitcom created by Will Carsola and Dave Stewart for Adult Swim. The show serves as a spin-off/sequel series to Mr. Pickles and focuses on Old Town's dimwitted Sheriff. The show premiered on Adult Swim on November 18, 2019, unannounced and disguised as an episode of Mr. Pickles, with the series finale to the original series airing right before. The show was renewed for a second season and premiered on February 15, 2021.

Plot 
The Sheriff patrols Old Town while having different misadventures. He is joined by Stanley Goodman who now works as the deputy.

Characters 

 Will Carsola as Sheriff, Boss and Deer Hunter #1
 Dave Stewart as Floyd, Linda, Dispatch, and Deer Hunter #2
 Kaitlyn Robrock as Tommy Goodman, Candy
 Brooke Shields as Beverly Goodman
 Jay Johnston as Stanley Goodman
 Frank Collison as Henry Gobbleblobber
 Alex Désert as Mr. Bojenkins

Episodes

Season 1 (2019)

Season 2 (2021)

References 

2010s American adult animated television series
2010s American black comedy television series
2010s American sitcoms
2010s American surreal comedy television series
2010s American workplace comedy television series
2020s American adult animated television series
2020s American black comedy television series
2020s American sitcoms
2020s American surreal comedy television series
2020s American workplace comedy television series
2019 American television series debuts
2021 American television series endings
American adult animated comedy television series
American adult animated television spin-offs
American animated sitcoms
American flash adult animated television series
American sequel television series
English-language television shows
Adult Swim original programming
Television series by Williams Street
Animated television series about children
Animated television series about dysfunctional families
2010s American police comedy television series
2020s American police comedy television series